Equinox Mountain is a  mountain in Bennington County, Vermont, United States, in the town of Manchester. The mountain is the highest peak of the Taconic Range, and the highest point of Bennington County. Equinox is the second highest peak in southern Vermont, after Stratton Mountain.

Geology

The Taconic Range ridgeline continues to the north from Equinox Mountain as Mother Myrick Mountain and south as Red Mountain; it is flanked to the west by Bennetts Ridge and Bear Mountain, also of the Taconic Range, and to the east by the western escarpment and plateau of the Green Mountains, across the Batten Kill valley. The southeast side of Equinox Mountain drains into the Batten Kill, thence into the Hudson River, and into New York Harbor. The northwest side of Equinox drains into the Green River, a tributary of the Batten Kill.

Buildings and other developments

Radio station WEQX's tower is located on the mountain, hence the callsign of the station.  There was a former hotel, the Sky Line Inn, which was torn down in 2011 to make way for a new visitor's center, the "Saint Bruno Viewing Center". A small, abandoned Cold War-era NORAD radar station can be seen near the summit. The site is now used for two-way communications including the Vermont State Police, and the other radio station to transmit from the mountain, Vermont Public Radio's WVTQ.

The Charterhouse of the Transfiguration monastery is situated on the slopes of the mountain.  Equinox Mountain can be climbed by several different hiking trails, though most visitors reach the summit via the paved toll road.

Wind farming

Adjacent to the larger Equinox Mountains is Little Equinox, where two wind farms have previously operated.  One wind turbine was installed in 1981 and three more in 1982, making Little Equinox Mountain the site of one of the first wind farms in the United States. These turbines, an early-generation design by WTG Systems of Buffalo, New York, were mounted on  truss towers and had a nominal peak output of 350 kW. The turbines, however, were plagued with mechanical issues, and by the mid-1980s all four were out of service, standing idle on the mountain from 1985 through 1989.

Green Mountain Power began operating the site in 1988, erecting a wind measurement tower and removing the four old turbines. It installed two U.S. Windpower 100 kW turbines in 1990, which ran for four years making electricity. Green Mountain Power removed its turbines and measurement tower in 1994. The company now owns the Searsburg Wind Farm in Searsburg, Vermont.

Endless Energy Corporation, a wind farm development company based in Maine, has expressed interest in the site for a modern wind farm. They have conducted wind measurements as well as environmental studies of Little Equinox Mountain. To build a wind farm in Vermont, the developer needs to go through the Public Service Board's Section 248 application process.

Summit panorama

See also 

 List of mountains in Vermont

References

External links 

 

Mountains of Vermont
Equinox
Taconic Mountains
Wind power in Vermont
Wind farms in Vermont
Mountains of Bennington County, Vermont